Carlos Quiroga is an Argentine former footballer who played as a forward and is a football manager.

Career 
Quiroga played with Andes Talleres Sport Club, and won the league title. In 1977, he played in the Argentine Primera División with Unión de Santa Fe. In 1978, he played with Gimnasia y Esgrima de Mendoza. In 1982, he played abroad in the Major Indoor Soccer League with the Buffalo Stallions. In 1983, he played in the National Soccer League with Toronto Italia where he assisted in securing the NSL Championship by contributing a goal against Dinamo Latino. He later returned to Argentina to play with Luján Sport Club.

Managerial career 
Quiroga later became the head coach for Argentina Academy, North York Azzurri Soccer Club, and the Mississauga Falcons Soccer Club. He later formed a soccer school known as CAQ Soccer Training.

Personal life 
Quiroga's sister Olga Quiroga married his friend, the former footballer Carlos Salguero.

References  

Living people
Argentine footballers
Argentine football managers
Unión de Santa Fe footballers
Gimnasia y Esgrima de Mendoza footballers
Buffalo Stallions players
Toronto Italia players
Argentine Primera División players
Major Indoor Soccer League (1978–1992) players
Canadian National Soccer League players
Association football forwards
Andes Talleres Sport Club players
Year of birth missing (living people)